Parabonna is a monotypic genus of South American ground spiders containing the single species, Parabonna goffergei. It was first described by Cândido Firmino de Mello-Leitão in 1947, and has only been found in Brazil.

References

Gnaphosidae
Monotypic Araneomorphae genera
Spiders of Brazil
Taxa named by Cândido Firmino de Mello-Leitão